Tejashree (born Sonali Jaikumar Khele) is an Indian actress who has appeared predominantly in Tamil films. Besides, she has also acted in Telugu, Kannada, Gujarati and Marathi films.

Tejashree is originally a from Nashik ( Tivandha Lane, Bhadrakali),she knows kathak and trained in kathak by her father Master Jaikumar Khele, a disciple of Pandit Gopi Krishna Maharaj. After a few modeling assignments, she broke into the southern film industry. She has danced in many item numbers and has good roles in big banner films.

She speaks fluent Tamil, despite being a Maharastrian from Mumbai. She has appeared in many television commercials, such as advertisements for Chennai Silk Saree shop, Kritika Shikekai Shampoo Powder, and K.P.G. Jewellery. Some of her biggest box office hits include Unakkum Enakkum (2006), Ottran (2003), Madhurey (2004) and Imsai Arasan 23m Pulikesi (2006).

Filmography

References

External links
 
 

Indian film actresses
Marathi actors
Living people
Actresses in Tamil cinema
Actresses in Marathi cinema
Actresses in Telugu cinema
Actresses in Hindi cinema
21st-century Indian actresses
1988 births